The Tim Conway Comedy Hour is a variety/sketch comedy television show broadcast in the United States by CBS as part of its 1970 fall lineup on Sundays at 10:00 pm.

Background
The Tim Conway Comedy Hour was one of several attempts to develop a starring vehicle for Tim Conway, who had been a sidekick in the 1962-1966 situation comedy McHale's Navy and two 1964 theatrical films spun off from it (McHale's Navy and McHale's Navy Joins the Air Force), and in several Disney films, but who had never had much success in developing an audience for programming in which he was the main star (see Rango). His previous show, the situation comedy The Tim Conway Show, had run for only 13 episodes in the spring of 1970, and had been cancelled almost at the same time that he agreed to host The Tim Conway Comedy Hour. Conway had two television flops in the same year.

Format
The show emphasized sketch comedy, musical production numbers and Conway's offbeat humor.  The show also featured guest stars:  Lana Turner, David Janssen, Joan Crawford, Audrey Meadows, Carl Reiner, Janet Leigh, Tony Randall, Imogene Coca, Shelley Winters, Carol Burnett and Mickey Rooney.

Reruns
The complete series was added to the Stirr program library in 2021 through a licensing arrangement with Shout! Factory.

References

External links

1970s American sketch comedy television series
CBS original programming
1970 American television series debuts
1970 American television series endings